Stanwood is a village in Mecosta County of the U.S. state of Michigan.  The population was 211 at the 2010 census. The village is within Mecosta Township.

Stanwood holds the record for the hottest recorded temperature in the state of Michigan along with Mio when it reached 112 °F (44 °C) on July 13, 1936.

Geography

Demographics

The area was settled by Ontario native John Bell in the 1850s. He was one of the first settlers in the area and logged in what would become Bell's Siding, which was a logging community, that was located near modern-day Morley Stanwood Middle School and High School.

2010 census
As of the census of 2010, there were 211 people, 76 households, and 59 families residing in the village. The racial makeup of the village was 95.3% White, 2.8% African American, and 1.9% from two or more races. Hispanic or Latino of any race were 2.8% of the population.

There were 76 households, of which 40.8% had children under the age of 18 living with them, 57.9% were married couples living together, 17.1% had a female householder with no husband present, 2.6% had a male householder with no wife present, and 22.4% were non-families. 18.4% of all households were made up of individuals, and 3.9% had someone living alone who was 65 years of age or older. The average household size was 2.78 and the average family size was 3.07.

The median age in the village was 37.4 years. 26.1% of residents were under the age of 18; 10.4% were between the ages of 18 and 24; 22.8% were from 25 to 44; 29.4% were from 45 to 64; and 11.4% were 65 years of age or older. The gender makeup of the village was 51.2% male and 48.8% female.

2000 census
As of the census of 2000, there were 204 people, 77 households, and 58 families residing in the village. The racial makeup of the village was 99.51% White, and 0.49% from two or more races.

There were 77 households, out of which 33.8% had children under the age of 18 living with them, 62.3% were married couples living together, 7.8% had a female householder with no husband present, and 23.4% were non-families. 18.2% of all households were made up of individuals, and 6.5% had someone living alone who was 65 years of age or older.  The average household size was 2.65 and the average family size was 2.97.

In the village, the population was spread out, with 25.0% under the age of 18, 6.9% from 18 to 24, 30.9% from 25 to 44, 27.0% from 45 to 64, and 10.3% who were 65 years of age or older.  The median age was 38 years. For every 100 females, there were 98.1 males.  For every 100 females age 18 and over, there were 104.0 males.

The median income for a household in the village was $39,000, and the median income for a family was $43,750. Males had a median income of $31,875 versus $25,625 for females. The per capita income for the village was $17,121.  None of the families and 3.8% of the population were living below the poverty line.

Transportation
Indian Trails provides daily intercity bus service between Grand Rapids and Petoskey, Michigan.

Economy
Nestlé Waters North America has a plant in Stanwood that produces Ice Mountain and Nestlé Pure Life bottled water.

Notable person
Ray Herbert, baseball player.

References

Villages in Mecosta County, Michigan
Villages in Michigan